Matías Germán Nani (born 26 March 1998) is an Argentine professional footballer who plays as a centre-back for Al-Shamal.

Club career
Nani had a youth spell in the systems of Argentinos Juniors and Lanús, featuring for the latter at the 2016 U-20 Copa Libertadores in Paraguay. In 2017, Serie A side Roma completed the signing of Nani. He made his unofficial debut for the club in a pre-season friendly win over Pinzolo Campiglio on 11 July 2017, prior to playing again days later versus 1. FC Slovácko. In the following month, on 16 August, Nani was loaned to Temperley of the Argentine Primera División. He made his professional debut over a week after during a home defeat to River Plate. He featured a total of fifteen times for them in 2017–18.

On 11 July 2018, Nani was signed on loan by Belgrano. His first appearances came in the succeeding October against Banfield and Vélez Sarsfield, on the way to nine total matches for the Córdoba-based outfit as they suffered relegation to Primera B Nacional. In July 2019, Nani returned to his homeland for a third loan away from Roma - as he agreed terms with newly promoted Primera División team Central Córdoba. Twenty-three appearances came, as did his first senior goal after he netted in a Copa de la Superliga loss to Newell's Old Boys on 15 March 2020; his last game before the COVID-enforced break.

In October 2020, Nani completed a permanent move back to Argentina with Unión Santa Fe.

International career
Nani represented the Argentina U20s at the 2016 COTIF Tournament in Spain. He won two caps, against Venezuela in the semi-finals and against Spain in the final; receiving a sending off in a 3–1 loss.

Career statistics
.

References

External links

1998 births
Living people
Sportspeople from Córdoba Province, Argentina
Argentine footballers
Argentina youth international footballers
Argentina under-20 international footballers
Association football defenders
Argentine expatriate footballers
Expatriate footballers in Italy
Argentine expatriate sportspeople in Italy
Serie A players
Argentine Primera División players
A.S. Roma players
Club Atlético Temperley footballers
Club Atlético Belgrano footballers
Central Córdoba de Santiago del Estero footballers
Unión de Santa Fe footballers
Al-Shamal SC players
Qatar Stars League players
Argentine expatriate sportspeople in Qatar
Expatriate footballers in Qatar